Bourg-de-Péage (Vivaro-Alpine dialect of ,) is a commune in the Drôme department in the region of Auvergne-Rhône-Alpes, France. Its inhabitants are called Péageois; in 2017, the population was 10,205.

Geography

Communes and neighboring towns

Hydrography
Bourg-de-Péage is separated from its sister town of Romans-sur-Isère by the Isère River.

History
The development of the town was due to the presence of a bridge, across the Isère, built by the monks of the Abbey Saint Bernard of Vienne, in 1033. They perceived a right of passage of this bridge. If the inhabitants of the jurisdiction of the current canton were exempt, with the exception of the days of major fairs, foreigners were however taxed at a premium. Similarly, the Isère  had to pay a tribute for their oars. This activity didn't slow the settlement of the habitat, and the hamlet of Pizançon (commune of Chatuzange-le-Goubet), which originally stood at the end of the bridge, saw its population grow rapidly.

Since the Middle Ages, the stone bridge was lined with three buildings: At the south stood a tower with a door at the base, near which stood the  house; in the north a chapel, known as Notre-Dame-du-Pont, and a small hospital then faced on each side of the roadway. The bridge was repeatedly damaged by the violent floods of the Isère. The tower, which proudly displayed the arms of the town of Romans and the Dauphiné, disappeared in the 17th century. On several occasions, destroyed arch bridges were replaced by wooden decks. In the 18th century work was undertaken for the reconstruction of the structure, completed in the century following its enlargement. However, the bridge would still endure fresh damage because on three occasions (in 1814, 1940 and 1944) its second arch was destroyed. When peace returned, it still retained the scar.

If Romans had acquired a great reputation with luxury shoe, Bourg-de-Péage owes its own to felt hats. Succeeding a solid tradition of hosiery under the Ancien Régime, mainly manufacturing women's underwear, felt headwear was introduced around 1810 by workers from Cognin in Isère. In 1811, three workshops were reported, and half a century later, this activity employed more than 400 workers divided into 16 workshops.

The felt was obtained from domestic rabbit hair, which was the subject of many processes, carried out by workers in difficult conditions of humidity, such as blowing or fulling. In the surrounding countryside, there were many workers collecting rabbit hair, and their activity was sometimes perpetuated in the name of localities. However, the installation of the railway line to Romans in 1864 put an end to the local origin of the raw material, since cheaper Australian rabbit hair was then preferred.

These imports thus caused hundreds of job losses in the countryside.

In 1883, an unprecedented crisis occurred for milliners due to the protectionist attitude of some countries where production flowed. The difficulties overcome, the activity grew further still until 1929 when it reached its apogee. At that time, the Mossant business, which was the pioneer of péageoise millinery, employed more than 1,200 workers, and many other workshops produced alongside the quality headwear of Mossant.

However, from 1930, the fashion of "bare heads" and the lack of exports caused a rapid decline of the headwear, although some workshops continued to operate until 1985.

Politics and administration

List of mayors

Population and society

Demography
In 2017, the commune had 10,205 inhabitants.

Education
The commune has several schools: Three kindergartens and four primary schools, including one private; two collèges, with one private. A school bus route was implemented by the municipality, for the schoolchildren of the commune.

Worship
The parish of Sainte Claire in Dauphiné includes the Catholic communities of Romans-sur-Isère, Bourg-de-Péage, Pizançon and Granges-lès-Beaumont.

Sport
Rowing: Aviron Romanais Péageois, created in 1908, is the first club of the Drôme and Ardèche. The greatest rower of the club is Laurent Porchier who was several times champion of France and world champion, and also Olympic champion at the 2000 Summer Olympics in Sydney.
Handball:  is a handball club. The women's team plays in the second division of the Championship of France for women.
Every two years, in December, the town of Bourg-de-Péage rewards its athletes at a party at the Jean Cocteau Centre.
Cycling: Stage 3 of the 2006 Critérium du Dauphiné Libéré, an individual time trial, occurred on a course around the commune, the stage was won by David Zabriskie. Stage 12 of the 2010 Tour de France began in Bourg-de-Péage with a stage finish in Mende. This stage was won by Joaquim Rodríguez. Stage 16 of the 2015 Tour de France will start in the commune on 20 July, and is scheduled to finish in Gap.

Cultural events and festivities
Bourg-de-Péage has many venues for performances and exhibitions (Salle Jean Cocteau, Espace François Mitterrand, Mossant Park)
Music Festival in the Park: Two days of concerts and entertainment.

The Rendez-vous de la magie:

Street entertainments, introductory workshops, amateur competition of magic, entertainments in schools and public places, etc.: For one week, it is the entire city which lives to the rhythm of the magic. The festival closes in beauty with the organization of three evenings, hosted by professional magicians of international scope, bringing together more than 1,500 spectators.

Economy
The Pascalis bakery is the oldest bakery in Bourg-de-Péage and dates from the 19th century. Its speciality is the famous  of Romans.

Transport

Road network

Railway network

The commune has access to two stations: The , as well as by the TGV Valence-Rhone-Alps-South.

Public transport
The commune of Bourg-de-Péage is served by the  bus network.

Culture and heritage

Places and monuments
Old bridge across the Isère between Romans-sur-Isère and Bourg-de-Péage
Favor House (Listed from 12 April 1972), a château built between 1798 and 1810 on the field of Bayanne.
Château de Mondy built at the end of the 17th century

Mossant hat shop (listed as an historic monument since 6 April 2004).
Clos of the Hermitage
In 2014, floral town with "three flowers" in the  Concours des villes et villages fleuris since 2008:  of parks and gardens, lawn, of massive, of trees and shrubs, hedges and of accompaniments of highways. An exceptional landscape that is the pride of the Peageois.
The Vercors sports complex

Specialities

Raviole du Dauphiné

Notable people
 (1744–1821), politician
 (1829-1914), priest and journalist
Charles Jourdan (1883–1976), fashion designer
, (1914–1996), Tibehirine monk
R. Toros (born 1934), sculptor,  (2000); Knight of the Legion of Honour (2009)
 (born 1958), magician
Didier Guillaume (born 1959), politician, president of the Socialist Group in the Senate
 (born 1969), politician, Mayor of Bourg de Péage, MP for the 4th district of Drôme
Romain Saïss (born 1990), Moroccan footballer

Twin towns/sister cities

Bourg-de-Péage is twinned with:
 East Grinstead, England, United Kingdom
 Mindelheim, Germany
 Sant Feliu de Guíxols, Spain
 Schwaz, Austria
 Verbania, Italy

See also
Communes of the Drôme department

Bibliography

References

External links

 Town hall website 
 Bourg-de-Péage on the site of the Institut géographique national  (archived 13 March 2007)

Communes of Drôme